VSSE may refer to:
 Veiligheid van de Staat - Sureté de l'État, the Belgian State Security Service
 The Vital Situation, Swift-Elimination International Intelligence Agency; a fictional organization in the Time Crisis series of video games